The 1982 Big League World Series took place from August 14–21 in Fort Lauderdale, Florida, United States. Puerto Rico defeated Venezuela in the championship game.

Teams

Results

References

Big League World Series
Big League World Series